Daydream Believer is a 2001 American film written and directed by Debra Eisenstadt and starring Sybil Kempson.

Cast
Sybil Kempson as Valerie Woodbury
Gladden Schrock as Boyd
Wendy Lawrence as Wendy
Andrew Hernin as Carl
Louis Puopolo as Kent Black
Sherri Parker Lee as Pamella

Reception
The film has a 100% rating on Rotten Tomatoes.

Accolade
At the 17th Independent Spirit Awards, Eisenstadt won the Someone to Watch Award for her work in the film.

References

External links
 
 

2000s English-language films
American drama films
2000s American films